KOVE (1330 AM) is a radio station broadcasting a news/talk format. Licensed to Lander, Wyoming, United States, the station serves the Riverton area.  The station is currently owned by Fremont Broadcasting, Inc.

On October 27, 2022 KOVE changed their format from country to news/talk.

Previous logo

References

External links

OVE
News and talk radio stations in the United States
Radio stations established in 1950
1950 establishments in Wyoming